The Space Rider (Space Reusable Integrated Demonstrator for Europe Return) is a planned uncrewed orbital lifting body spaceplane aiming to provide the European Space Agency (ESA) with affordable and routine access to space. Contracts for construction of the vehicle and ground infrastructure were signed in December 2020. Its maiden flight is currently scheduled for late 2024.

Development of Space Rider is being led by the Italian Programme for Reusable In-orbit Demonstrator in Europe (PRIDE programme) in collaboration with ESA, and is the continuation of the Intermediate eXperimental Vehicle (IXV) experience, launched on 11 February 2015. The cost of this phase, not including the launcher, is at least US$36.7 million. At the ESA Ministerial Council held in Seville in November 2019, the development of the Space Rider was subscribed by the participating member states with an allocation of €195.73 million.

History 
The European Space Agency has a program called Future Launchers Preparatory Programme (FLPP), which made a call for submissions for a reusable spaceplane. One of the submissions was by the Italian Space Agency, that presented their own Programme for Reusable In-orbit Demonstrator in Europe (PRIDE programme) which went ahead to develop the precursor called Intermediate eXperimental Vehicle (IXV) and the resulting Space Rider.

Funding was initially approved by the ESA in 2016, with the project to be led by the Italian Aerospace Research Centre (CIRA). Thales Alenia Space and Lockheed Martin were tasked with completing the design by 2019. In November 2017, the ESA approved funding to Thales Alenia Space and Avio to build reentry and service modules, respectively. In late November 2019, the project was fully approved by ESA and will be funded mostly by Italy, and in December 2020, ESA signed contracts with co-prime contractors Thales Alenia Space and Avio for delivery of the Space Rider flight model, which in turn manage a consortium of more than 20 European companies operating in the space sector. The Italian Space Agency (ASI) subsequently contracted with Virgin Galactic for a suborbital research flight on SpaceShipTwo for research related to Space Rider. The first flight of Space Rider is currently scheduled for late 2024.

In April 2018, ESA released an Announcement of Opportunity (AoO) to fly small payloads on Space Rider's maiden flight. By June 2019, the project was advancing towards the Critical Design Review (CDR) at the end of 2019. An industrial reorganisation followed the ESA Ministerial Council held in 2019. To deal with it a design bridging phase was put in place with the System CDR planned in mid-2022.

On completion of the two-month long maiden mission, Space Rider will return to Earth with the payloads stowed in its cargo bay. This qualification flight of Space Rider will take place in 2024 followed by several missions to demonstrate a range of capabilities and orbits, before handing over the project to the private sector. 

By 2025, the ESA plans to privatise the Space Rider, with Arianespace the likely operator.

Design 
The Space Rider design inherits technology developed for the earlier Intermediate eXperimental Vehicle, also within the Programme for Reusable In-orbit Demonstrator in Europe (PRIDE). The design team considered the trade-offs of using only a lifting body and also using optional wings or vertical fins. It was then decided in 2017 that the design should optimise the internal volume of the Vega rocket fairing, so its aerodynamic shape will be a simple lifting body, as tested on its predecessor, the IXV. 3-axis control is achieved by the use of rear flaps.

Space Rider will have the potential to allow experiments in microgravity, such as exposure of materials to outer space and in-orbit validation of technologies, as well as deployment of small satellites.

In 2019, some parafoil guided landing tests will be performed by dropping a full-scale model from helicopters or balloons.

Space Rider is designed to launch atop the Vega-C launch vehicle from Guiana Space Centre. The spacecraft is being designed to conduct missions up to two months long in low Earth orbit with up to 600 kg of cargo. The re-entry module itself is a testbed for entry technologies as the IXV precursor was, so future improvements are envisioned, including point-to-point flights, even "space tourism".

Activities for Phase-B2/C, covering the Preliminary Design Review (PDR) started on 25 January 2018, and the Critical Design Review (CDR) begin in late 2019. An industrial reorganisation followed the ESA Ministerial Council held in 2019. To deal with it a design bridging phase was put in place with the System CDR planned in mid-2022.

Service module 
Space Rider's service module is a modified version of the Vega-C AVUM+, which will extend the time that can be spent in orbit by at least two months before Space Rider returns with its cargo to Earth to land on the ground. The service module will provide power, attitude control and deorbit capability, and it will separate from the spacecraft just before atmospheric reentry.

Landing 

Upon atmospheric entry, the lifting body shape will decelerate the spacecraft to subsonic speed (below Mach 0.8), when one or two drogue parachute will be deployed at about 15–12 km altitude to slow it further (to Mach 0.18 - 0.22) Then, a controllable gliding parachute called parafoil will be deployed to begin the controlled descent phase for a nearly horizontal touchdown (≈35 m/s) using no wheels. The landing concept is similar to the NASA X-38 landing system.

The baseline landing site is the Guiana Space Centre. For orbits with inclination >37°, landings could be performed at the Portuguese Santa Maria Island in the Azores archipelago.

Preliminary specifications

See also 

 Boeing X-37, a winged spaceplane by the U.S. Air Force
 Dream Chaser, a private lifting body spaceplane
 Hermes (spaceplane), CNES/ESA spaceplane concept from 1975
 SUSIE, a 2022 ArianeGroup proposal for a reusable, crewed, spacecraft
 List of spaceplanes

References 

Spaceplanes
Proposed European Space Agency spacecraft
2024 in spaceflight
Proposed spacecraft
Reusable spacecraft